Zofia Mrozowska (24 August 1922 – 19 August 1983) was a Polish film actress. She appeared in 20 films between 1947 and 1983.

Selected filmography
 Unvanquished City (1950)
 A Woman's Decision (1975)
 The Constant Factor (1980)

References

External links

1922 births
1983 deaths
Polish film actresses
Actresses from Warsaw
20th-century Polish actresses